European route E 575 is a road part of the International E-road network. It begins in Bratislava, Dunajská Streda, Slovakia and ends in Győr, Hungary.

Route and E-road junctions 
  (on shared signage  I/63 then  I/13)
 Dunajská Streda
 Medveďov (near Hungarian border)
  (on shared signage )
 Vámosszabadi (near Slovakian border)
 Győr:  ,

External links 
 UN Economic Commission for Europe: Overall Map of E-road Network (2007)
 International E-road network

699671
Roads in Slovakia
Roads in Hungary